Biraj is an Indian and Nepalese Hindu male given name. Biraj may refer to:
 Biraj Bhatta, Nepalese actor
 Biraj Maharjan, Nepalese footballer
 Andrew Biraj, Bangladeshi photojournalist
 Biraj Bahu Bollywood film
 Biraj Bhattarai Musical Artist

Nepalese masculine given names
Indian given names